Chuck's Choice is a Canadian animated television series produced by DHX Media (now known as WildBrain) for Corus Entertainment that originally aired on YTV from May 6, 2017 to June 9, 2017. 20 episodes were produced.

The show follows Chuck McFarlane, an 11-year-old boy with an alien robot. When he gets himself into a lot of difficult situations, his robot, UD, hacks into 'decider mode'. Time freezes and UD gives Chuck three choices. He has to choose one and it will come true, but not always in the way he expects. His best friend, Misha, knows the art of combat and is often saving Chuck from monsters and threats.  Whenever Chuck chooses to teleport them somewhere, Misha always comes with him.

Plot
The series is about an 11-year-old boy named Chuck McFarlane who has an intergalactic reality-altering robot named U.D. who manifests one of three choices throughout his day, leading to diverging adventures in each timeline.

This is called "Decider Mode" and time appears to freeze for everyone but U.D. and "The Decider" (normally Chuck). Although they seem random, U.D. reveals the ability to influence the selection in "Flush Hour Two" when he generates three identical options to seek help from a pirate monkey to rescue Ariana, the goldfish he befriended that belongs to Chuck's best friend Misha.

Characters

Main
 Chuck McFarlane (voiced by Sabrina Pitre) is the eponymous hero of the series.
 UD (short for U-Decide 3000, voiced by Ryan Beil) is the choice-enabling alien robot who bends reality to suit Chuck's whims.
 Misha (voiced by Kira Tozer) is Chuck's best friend, and the heroine of the series. Chuck frequently nicknames her "Mish", dropping the "a" from the end and halving the syllable count. Closed captions frequently spell her name as Meesha or Meesh. She has hair tied into a ponytail which is purple and pink. She is 12.

Recurring
 Ellen (voiced by Rebecca Shoichet) is Chuck and Norm's mom. She is a caterer.
Norm McFarlane (voiced by Peter Kelamis)  is Chuck's older brother.
Ash (as she calls herself, or Ashley, as Norm calls her; voiced by Rebecca Shoichet) is a student. She is a girl with glasses and purple twintails who Norm is romantically interested in. She loses her retainer and is called "milady". She has a "nerdy laugh" according to captions and finds varying things interesting about Norm, such as his being a former villain (after losing ice powers in "Cool Hand Norm") or him being comfortable with his body (farting after he does).
 Misha's Mom and Dad (voiced by Tabitha St. Germain and Ian Hanlin) are strict about her getting good grades.
 Joey Adonis (voiced by Vincent Tong) is a fat-rich boy who antagonizes Chuck.
Biff Adonis (voiced by Ken Page) is Joey's movie star dad who Chuck admires.
Alfie (voiced by Jeff Bennett) is Joey's butler who bathes him. He considers Chuck practically a bestie.
 Pepper (voiced by Anndi McAfee) is a girl with ginger hair and glasses. Misha chooses her for a lab partner in "Smarten Up Chuck" and in another episode, she has the same hairstyle as Misha on picture day. In "Ultimate Chuck" she and Joey are picking volleyball teams and fight over Chuck until he hugs them, joining both.
 Nikole Denishlea (voiced by Jenna Claudette) is a ginger girl with hair covering one of her eyes. She is among a group who flees Norm's flirtations and asks with disapproval if Chuck knows him. At the end of "Abraham Stinking", she is depicted on a date with Norm and likes his skunk breath.
 Ms. Cho (voiced by Shannon Chan-Kent) is Chuck's teacher.
 Dr. Crown (voiced by Kevin Michael Richardson) is a dreaded dentist.
 Coach Dwayne (voiced by Michael Daingerfield) is the balding gym teacher with a mustache and glasses. 
 Chilly Parchuway (voiced by Peter New)

Villains 
 Borkle
 Mishina 
 Eggmond

Series overview

Episodes

Season 1 (2017) 
The first season of Chuck's Choice consists of 20 episodes (40 segments, since the first episode has two segments and two-part final episode special of season 1 finale).

References

Television series by DHX Media
2017 Canadian television series debuts
2017 Canadian television series endings
2010s Canadian animated television series
Canadian children's animated comedy television series
Canadian flash animated television series
Fictional duos
English-language television shows
YTV (Canadian TV channel) original programming
Animated television series about children
Animated television series about robots